Argentina Mercedes González Morel (December 20, 1920 – October 2, 2013), known as Monica Boyar,  was a Dominican-born American nightclub singer who was popular in the 1940s and 1950s.

Early life and family

Argentina Mercedes González Morel was born to Pablo González Valerio and Juanita Morel, in Mao, Dominican Republic. In 1929, her family emigrated to the United States, and settled down in Manhattan, New York City.

Musical influence
Boyar became a United States citizen after residing in the country from the age of eight. She was a dedicated student of the folk music of all countries.

She was called the satin Latin song stylist. and sometimes the Ruban Blue-Bird. Walter Winchell said that she was the finest Latin talent in the entertainment field in 1960.

During the 1939 New York World's Fair she made a concerted effort to persuade Americans to adopt the Dominican Republic's native dance, the merengue. An initial reluctance eventually subsided, and by 1955 it was the fastest growing dance in the U.S. When Boyar introduced calypso songs to America, many felt the music was not commercial. By 1954 calypso songs were among the bestsellers.

She introduced a new song, That's Why A Woman Loves A Heel, in October 1945. By 1948 Boyar had appeared on every overseas radio network. Boyar entertained at Ciro's in Mexico City and the Hotel Nacional in Havana. Among her numerous nightclub engagements was a December 1955 performance at the Viennese Lantern, at 242 East 79th Street in Yorkville, Manhattan. A lawsuit was taken out by an angry tenant who resided above the club. He contended that Boyar's bongo drummer kept him awake.

Clothing designer
Boyar was a fashion designer for stage and motion picture stars. Her designs were very original yet simple. She also created expensive handbags. She had over two hundred gowns to wear to performances in her New York City apartment.

Other
She appeared in the three-minute short  Princess Papaya (1945). Boyar played a singer in an episode of the television show Mister Peepers, in 1952. In 1961 she received a Universal Pictures screen test.

Her first husband was Federico Horacio "Gugu" Vásquez Henríquez. She was widowed when her husband was captured and executed after landing at Luperón, Puerto Plata in 1949 as part of a plot against Dominican dictator Rafael Trujillo.

Her second husband was actor Leslie Nielsen, from 1950 to 1956. They separated in August 1955, with Nielsen obtaining a default divorce in June 1956. He agreed to pay $19,000 ($ today) in lieu of alimony, by monthly installments of $500.

She married comedian Lee Tully in March 1958 and divorced him in Mexico three months later.

Boyar was friends with Marlon Brando, who visited her when she was hospitalized at New York’s Lenox Hill Hospital, in January 1955.

Death
Boyar died on October 2, 2013, from complications due to stroke at age 92 in Las Vegas, Nevada, where she resided.

References

External links
Monica Boyar in a Honolulu Advertiser photo (1961)

1920 births
2013 deaths
People from Santa Cruz de Mao
American women singers
Dominican Republic emigrants to the United States
American actresses
Dominican Republic fashion designers
American female dancers
American dancers
Nightclub performers
Dominican Republic women fashion designers
21st-century American women